The Unpleasant World of Penn & Teller is a British magic show presented by Penn & Teller in 1994 on Channel 4. The show featured segments deconstructing magic tricks, while performing some of their signature comedy magic stunts, essentially introducing the pair to a British audience. The first or middle segments would always feature a British celebrity like Stephen Fry or John Cleese. Another running gag that ended each episode was one where the pair would promise the audience that they never did any camera tricks for their magic, with the gag being that, at that moment, a camera trick would be done to the TV audience.

Episodes

References

External links

1994 British television series debuts
1994 British television series endings
British television magic series
Channel 4 original programming